John Ross was a Scottish footballer. His regular positions were defensive: right half or right back, although he began his career at outside right and scored the only two goals of his career in 1921–22 while in that forward role. He played for Dundee for eight seasons – meeting King Alfonso XIII of Spain as team captain in a 1923 tour and featuring on the losing side in the 1925 Scottish Cup Final – then switched to local rivals Dundee United for just over one season, then played in Wales with Connah's Quay.

References

Scottish footballers
Footballers from Paisley, Renfrewshire
Dundee F.C. players
Dundee United F.C. players
Connah's Quay & Shotton F.C. players
Year of birth unknown
Year of death unknown
Association football defenders